Slobodan "Danko" Popović (Serbian Cyrillic: Слободан Данко Поповић; 19 August 1928 – 7 August 2009) was a Serbian writer, playwright and screenwriter.

Popović was born in Aranđelovac, Kingdom of Serbs, Croats and Slovenes. He graduated from the University of Belgrade's Law School, where he spent the biggest part of life and where he started his literary work. Danko, however, also returned regularly to his home town and property nearby Bukulja. He wrote several novels, collections of short stories and scenarios for TV, Film and radio dramas.

Vladan Matijević was the 2015 recipient of the Danko Popović Award.

Work (selection)
Prose (selection)
 Svečanosti, (Celebrities), Nolit, Belgrade 1962.
 Kukurek i kost, Slovo ljubve, Belgrade 1976. 
 Čarapići, Nolit, Belgrade 1969.
 Oficiri, Minerva, Subotica 1979.
 Knjiga o Milutinu, Publishing series Biblioteka Književne novine, Belgrade 1985.
 Konak u Kragujevcu, Publishing series Biblioteka Književne novine, Belgrade 1988, .
 Blood Blossoms of Kosovo: Chronicle About the Serbian Holy Land, edited by Sofija Škorić, translated by Ralph Bogert, Serbian Literary Company, Toronto 1997, .
 Četiri vetra - pisma prijatelju u Torontu, Prometej and Jefimija, Novi Sad and Kragujevac 2004, .
 The Book of Milutin, translated by Svetlana Milošević, Knjiga komerc, Belgrade 2018, .
Filmography (selection)
 Pukovnikovica (Colonel's Wife), screenplay, Studio Film danas 1972.
 Josef Šulc (Joseph Schultz; Leading Actor: Faruk Begolli), short film, co-author, Zastava Film 1973.
 Karađorđeva smrt, TVB 1984.

References

1928 births
2009 deaths
People from Aranđelovac
University of Belgrade Faculty of Law alumni
Serbian dramatists and playwrights
Serbian screenwriters
Male screenwriters
20th-century dramatists and playwrights
Burials at Serbian Orthodox monasteries and churches
20th-century screenwriters